Thet U Lai (born 10 May 1947) is a Burmese boxer. He competed in the men's light flyweight event at the 1968 Summer Olympics. At the 1968 Summer Olympics, he lost to Hatha Karunaratne of Sri Lanka.

References

External links
 

1947 births
Living people
Burmese male boxers
Olympic boxers of Myanmar
Boxers at the 1968 Summer Olympics
People from Ayeyarwady Region
Light-flyweight boxers